The Australian cricket team toured England in the 1972 season to play a five-match Test series against England for the Ashes. The series was drawn 2–2 and England retained the Ashes. This was the last drawn series until 2019. The two sides also played a three-match ODI series, which England won 2–1.

Australian squad
The following squad was selected by Neil Harvey, Sam Loxton and Phil Ridings:
Batsmen – Ian Chappell (captain), Greg Chappell, Ross Edwards, Bruce Francis, Doug Walters, Paul Sheahan, Keith Stackpole
Wicket-keepers – Rod Marsh, Brian Taber
Fast bowlers – Dennis Lillee, Bob Massie, David Colley, Jeff Hammond
All-rounders – John Inverarity, Graeme Watson
Spinners – John Gleeson, Ashley Mallett
Controversial omissions from the squad included Bill Lawry, Graham McKenzie and Ian Redpath.

Test series

1st Test

2nd Test

3rd Test

4th Test

5th Test

The series was drawn 2–2, which meant that England retained the Ashes.

ODI series

1st ODI

2nd ODI

3rd ODI

References

Annual reviews
 Playfair Cricket Annual 1973
 Wisden Cricketers' Almanack 1973

Further reading
 Bill Frindall, The Wisden Book of Test Cricket 1877–1978, Wisden, 1979

External links
  The Ashes, 1972 at ESPN Cricinfo
 CricketArchive – tour itineraries

1972 in Australian cricket
1972 in English cricket
1972
International cricket competitions from 1970–71 to 1975
1972